Philippe Tuitoga (born ) is a French male volleyball player. He is part of the France men's national volleyball team. On club level he plays for TOAC TUC.

References

External links
 profile at FIVB.org

1990 births
Living people
French men's volleyball players
Volleyball players at the 2015 European Games
European Games competitors for France